Guaraciaba is a municipality situated in the state of Santa Catarina, Brazil, with an estimated population in 2020 of 10,026 inhabitants.

References

Municipalities in Santa Catarina (state)